Martina Navratilova and Arantxa Sánchez Vicario were the defending champions, but they chose not to participate together. Navratilova partnered Pam Shriver, but lost in the quarterfinal to Katrina Adams and Mercedes Paz. Sánchez Vicario played alongside Helena Suková, but lost in the semifinal to Claudia Kohde-Kilsch and Natalia Zvereva.

Kohde-Kilsch and Zvereve went on to win the title, defeating Mary-Lou Daniels and Lise Gregory in the final, 6–4, 6–0.

Seeds 
The top four seeds received a bye to the second round.

Draw

Finals

Top half

Bottom half

References

External links 
 [ ITF tournament edition details]

Virginia Slims of Chicago
Ameritech Cup
Virginia Slims of Chicago